The Enigma of Kaspar Hauser (lit. Every Man for Himself and God Against All) is a 1974 West German drama film written and directed by Werner Herzog and starring Bruno Schleinstein (credited as Bruno S.) and Walter Ladengast. The film closely follows the real story of foundling Kaspar Hauser, using the text of actual letters found with Hauser.

Plot
The film follows Kaspar Hauser, who has lived the first seventeen years of his life chained in a tiny cellar with only a toy horse to occupy his time, devoid of all human contact except for a man, wearing a black overcoat and top hat, who fed him.

One day, in 1828, the same man takes Hauser out of his cell, teaches him a few phrases, and how to walk, before leaving him in the town of Nuremberg. Hauser becomes the subject of much curiosity, and is exhibited in a circus before being rescued by Professor Georg Friedrich Daumer, who patiently attempts to transform him.

Hauser soon learns to read and write, and develops unorthodox approaches to logic and religion; but music is what pleases him most. He attracts the attention of academics, clergy and nobility. He is then physically attacked by the same unknown man who brought him to Nuremberg. The attack leaves him unconscious with a bleeding head. He recovers, but is again mysteriously attacked; this time, stabbed in the chest.

Hauser rests in bed describing visions he has had of nomadic Berbers in the Sahara Desert, and then dies. An autopsy reveals an enlarged liver and cerebellum.

Cast
The casting and character names are based on the submission to the Academy of Motion Picture Arts & Sciences.

 Bruno S. as Kaspar Hauser
 Walter Ladengast as Professor Georg Friedrich Daumer
 Brigitte Mira as Frau Käthe, housekeeper for Professor Daumer
 Reinhard Hauff as a farmer
 Herbert Fritsch as the Mayor
 Florian Fricke as M. Florian, the blind pianist
 Henry van Lyck as the Cavalry Captain
 Willy Semmelrogge as the Circus Director
  as Lord Stanhope
  as an unknown man
 Volker Prechtel as Hiltel, the prison guard
 Gloria Doer as Frau Hiltel
 Marcus Weller as Julius, the son of Hiltel
 Herbert Achternbusch as the Bavarian chicken hypnotizer
 Wolfgang Bauer as a farmboy
 Wilhelm Bayer as the taunting farmboy
 Franz Brumbach as the bear trainer
 Johannes Buzalski as the Police Inspector  
 Helmut Döring as the Little King
 Enno Patalas as Pastor Fuhrmann
 Clemens Scheitz as the Scribe
  as the professor of logic
 Andi Gottwald as the young Mozart
 Kidlat Tahimik as Hombrecito

Production

Writing
Herzog has been quoted as saying that the title for the film was inspired by a sentence in the novel Macunaíma by Brazilian writer Mário de Andrade.

The film follows the real story of Kaspar Hauser quite closely, using the text of actual letters found with Hauser, and following many details in the opening sequence of Hauser's confinement and release. The characters of Professor Daumer and of Lord Stanhope are also based on historical figures, Georg Friedrich Daumer and Philip Henry Stanhope, 4th Earl Stanhope, respectively.

An English-language translation of the screenplay was published in 1980 by Tanam Press.

Casting and crew
Herzog discovered the lead actor, Bruno Schleinstein, in a documentary about street musicians Bruno der Schwarze, es blies ein Jäger wohl in sein Horn (lit. Bruno the Black One, A Hunter Blows his Horn). Fascinated, Herzog cast him as the lead for The Enigma of Kaspar Hauser despite the fact that he had no training as an actor. Further, the historical Hauser was 17 when he was discovered in Nuremberg and the film implies this. Schleinstein was 41 years old at the time of filming, although his character is treated and described throughout as a youth. Schleinstein's own life bore some similarities to Kaspar Hauser's, and his own unbalanced personality was often expressed on set. In Herzog's commentary for the English language DVD release, he recalls that Schleinstein remained in costume for the entire duration of the production, even after shooting was done for the day. Herzog once visited him in his hotel room, to find him sleeping on the floor by the door, in his costume. Schleinstein was credited only as "Bruno S." in the film. Herzog subsequently wrote Schleinstein into the screenplay for a second film, Stroszek (1977).

The production designer for the film was Henning von Gierke; the costume designers were Ann Poppel and Gisela Storch.

Filming locations
The outdoor scenes were filmed in the town of Dinkelsbühl and on a nearby mountain called Hesselberg.
 Croagh Patrick, Westport, Mayo, Ireland (archive footage)
 Dinkelsbühl, Bavaria, West Germany 
 Western Sahara

Music
The music of several classical composers is featured in the film's soundtrack, including pieces by Johann Pachelbel, Orlande de Lassus, Tomaso Albinoni, and Wolfgang Amadeus Mozart.

Wolfgang Amadeus Mozart	(1791) – "Dies Bildnis ist bezaubernd schön" (From the opera "Die Zauberflöte") – sung by Heinrich Knote (1911)

Johann Pachelbel (1700) – Canon in D Major	

Orlando Di Lasso – Requiem à 5

Tomaso Albinoni – Adagio – musical arrangement: Remo Giazotto (ca 1945)

Reception

Critical response
In 2005, critic Walter Chaw summed up the film as "a strange, brave performance housed in an anti-linear film stuffed with obscure images and silent passages of profound, frightening insight", adding "That the director identifies so deeply with a foundling in 19th century Germany who appeared in the middle of a town square having spent his whole life chained to a floor in a basement dungeon speaks volumes to Herzog's feeling of detachment in intellectual, artistic, and social environments." In 2007, the critic Roger Ebert wrote a retrospective review of the film, which he had included in his list of "Great Movies", saying "In Herzog the line between fact and fiction is a shifting one. He cares not for accuracy but for effect, for a transcendent ecstasy."

Writing in 2001, Maria Racheva said ".. Herzog, the director, unlike François Truffaut in The Wild Child, is not interested in showing the painful process of adaptation to civilized surroundings; Kaspar has a special consciousness in which the laws of nature have a central place and in which the conventions and norms of civilized behavior are as artificial and inconvenient to him as the black dinner jacket he is forced to wear. His difficulties in communication are not the result of any linguistic inadequacies; simply, he is "different" from other men. That is why Herzog seems to wish to persuade us that, despite being gratuitous, both the early isolation and the surprising death of his hero are somehow logical. ... This summary of plot sounds like a fairy tale—and it is. Most of Herzog's films recall fables, and that is surely one of the reasons for their success."

On review aggregator website Rotten Tomatoes, the film holds a 95% score based on 21 reviews, with an average rating of 8.3/10.

In 2017 David Fear and Peter Travers, in Rolling Stone magazine, said: "Based on the true story of a young man who spent the first 17 years of his life never leaving his tiny room – and then became a public sensation when he finally ventured out into society – Herzog's cracked biopic would have felt offbeat and intriguing enough on its own. Still, the director thought he’d make things even more interesting by casting a 41-year-old street musician credited as "Bruno S." who had spent decades in and out of mental institutions and had never acted before. The result is one of the more odd and affecting performances in Herzog's movies – part guileless, part gimmicky and all genuinely WTF. A bold experiment that paid off in a big way."

Accolades
The film was invited for the 1975 Cannes Film Festival. It won the Grand Prix Spécial du Jury, which is the second prize for films "in competition" at the festival; the first is the Palme d'Or. In addition, it won the FIPRESCI Prize and the Prize of the Ecumenical Jury. The film won two German Film Awards: to Beate Mainka-Jellinghaus for editing, and to Henning von Gierke for scene design. Herzog won the second prize (Filmband in Silber) in the category "Feature Film Direction" (programmfüllender Spielfilm (Gestaltung)), which came with a substantial cash prize. The film was selected as the West German entry for the Best Foreign Language Film at the 48th Academy Awards, but was not accepted as a nomination.

Home media
The Enigma of Kaspar Hauser was released to region 1 DVD in 2002. The film is included in a Blu-ray (region-A) collection of Herzog's films that was published in the US in 2014. It was also included in a region-B collection published in the United Kingdom in 2014. It had been released in 1993 as a VHS tape with the English language title The Mystery of Kaspar Hauser.

See also
 New German Cinema
 List of submissions to the 48th Academy Awards for Best Foreign Language Film
 List of German submissions for the Academy Award for Best Foreign Language Film
 Werner Herzog bibliography
 Feral child

References
Notes

Citations

Further reading
 
 
  Recent appreciation of Herzog and the film by the noted critic Derek Malcolm, who includes the film in his listing

External links
 
 

1970s biographical drama films
1970s historical drama films
1974 films
1970s English-language films
Films directed by Werner Herzog
Films set in Germany
Films set in 1828
Films set in the 1830s
German biographical drama films
German historical drama films
1970s German-language films
West German films
1974 drama films
Cannes Grand Prix winners
Kaspar Hauser
Films with atheism-related themes
Films critical of religion
1970s German films
Films about disability